District courts are courts of limited jurisdiction in the State of Michigan.  They were established by the State Legislature in Act 236 of 1961 to consolidate the functions of several courts of limited jurisdiction such as traffic courts and municipal courts. In response, nearly all cities in the state have ceased operating a municipal court, except for the five Grosse Pointes in Wayne County; each has its own municipal court, except for Grosse Pointe Woods and Grosse Pointe Shores, which operate one jointly.

There are currently 105 district courts in the state.  They handle most traffic violations, civil disputes seeking money damages up to $25,000, landlord-tenant disputes and criminal cases in which the defendant is charged with a misdemeanor that is punishable by not more than one-year imprisonment. 

District Judges are elected for six-year terms and may appoint magistrates.  Magistrates may set bail and accept bonds in criminal matters, accept guilty pleas, impose sentences for dog, game, traffic, motor carrier, snowmobile and boat law violations.  They may also issue arrest and search warrants.  Attorney magistrates may also hear small claims cases or perform other duties described in the statute, as directed by the Chief Judge.

A person aged 17-years or older who is charged with a crime will begin his or her case with an appearance before a district court judge. In an appearance, the district court will explain the charges to the defendant along with his or her rights, and the possible consequences if convicted of the charge.  The court also determines the amount and conditions of bail and collects it if the defendant is able to post a bond. 

If a defendant is charged with a misdemeanor that is punishable by not more than one year in jail, the district court will conduct a trial and sentence the defendant if he or she is found guilty. 

In felony cases (generally, cases that are punishable by more than one year in prison), the district court will set the bail amount and hold a preliminary examination to determine if a crime was committed and if there is probable cause to believe the defendant committed the crime. If so, the case is transferred to the circuit court for trial and is referred to as having been "bound over."

District courts also contain a small claims division which handles civil cases up to $5,500.  For these cases, the parties must agree to waive their right to a jury, representation by a lawyer, rules of evidence and to appeal the decision of the district judge.  If the parties do not agree to these terms, the case is heard in the district court’s general civil division.

References

External links 
 Michigan Courts at Mi.Gov

Michigan state courts
1961 establishments in Michigan
Courts and tribunals established in 1961